Mohammadabad-e Shokur (also Romanized as Moḩammadābād-e Shokūr; also known as Moḩammadābād, Moḩammadābād-e Eshkūl, Moḩammadābād-e Eshkūr, and Maḩmūdābād-e Shakūr) is a village in Estabraq Rural District, in the Central District of Shahr-e Babak County, Kerman Province, Iran. At the 2006 census, its population was 683, in 166 families.

References 

Populated places in Shahr-e Babak County